This is a list of the first women lawyer(s) and judge(s) in New Hampshire. It includes the year in which the women were admitted to practice law (in parentheses). Also included are women who achieved other distinctions such becoming the first in their state to graduate from law school or become a political figure.

Firsts in New Hampshire's history

Lawyers 

 First female: Marilla Ricker (1890) 
 First female litigator: Laura J. Kahn (1968)

State judges 
 First female (municipal court): Idella Jenness in 1935 
First female: Jean K. Burling (1973) in 1979 
First female (superior court): Linda S. Dalianis (1970) in 1980
First female (Supreme Court of New Hampshire): Linda S. Dalianis (1970) in 2000 
First female (Chief Justice; Supreme Court of New Hampshire): Linda S. Dalianis (1970) in 2010

Federal judges 
First female (U.S. District Court for the District of New Hampshire): Landya B. McCafferty (1991) in 2013

Attorney General of New Hampshire 
First female law clerk: Jennie Blanche Newhall (1920) 
First female: Kelly Ayotte (1993) from 2004-2009

Assistant Attorney General 

 First female: Marilla Ricker (1890) in 1893

United States Attorney 
 First female: Emily Gray Rice (1984) in 2016

Bar associations 
 First female admitted (New Hampshire Bar Association): Agnes Winifred "Winnie" McLaughlin (1917) 
 First female presidents (New Hampshire Bar Association): Patti Blanchette and Susan B. Carbon from 1992-1993 and 1993-1994 respectively 
First female president (New Hampshire Women's Bar Association): Maureen Raiche Manning in 1998

First 100 women admitted to practice law in New Hampshire 

Agnes Winifred McLaughlin
Jennie Blanche Newhall
Margaret Sheehan Blodgett
Charlotte Helen George
Sara T. Knox
Esther Gottesfeld Lublin
Miriam G. Rosenblum
Pauline Swain Merrill
Harriet E. Mansfield
Paula Ladday
Florence T. Cavanaugh
Nina N. Frankman
Marguerita M. Hurley
Evelyn C. Earley
Emily Marx
Beatrice F. Little
Beryle M. Aldrich
Mary Alice Fountain
Celia D.R. Novins
Evangeline V. Tallman
Doris Louise Bennett
Mary E. Perkins
Pauline B. Barnard
Mabelle Fellows Murphy
Leila L. Maynard
Ida V. C. Milligan
Ruth I. Moses
Margaret Quill Flynn
Lucille Kozlowski
Irma A. Matthews
Catharine B. Sage
Anne M. Howorth
Rachel Hallett Johnson
Caroline R. Grey
Constance M. Mehegan
Winnifred M. Moran
Constance J. Betley
Helen White
Judith Dunlop Ransmeier
Mary Susan Stein Leahy
Laura Jane Kahn
Martha Margaret Davis
Eleanor S. Krasnow
Susan B. Monson
Julia N. Nelson
Dorothy R. Sullivan
Jean K. Burling
Donna W. Economou
Alexandra T. Breed
Linda Stewart Dalianis
Claudia Cords Damon
Georgia C. Griffin
Barbara Sard
Bruce Earman Viles
Joyce Ann Wilder
Joan L. Carroll
Anne Swift Almy
Sharon Ann Coughlin
Anne M. Goggin
J. Campbell Harvey
Judith Miller Kasper
Patricia McKee
Ellen J. Musinsky
Brenda T. Piampiano
Janina Stodolski
Elizabeth B. Sullivan
Priscilla B. Fox
Micki B. Stiller
Mae C. Bradshaw
Anne Cagwin Hagstrom
Deborah J. Cooper
Lynne M. Dennis
Nancy E. Ebb
Abigail Elias
Alice S. Love
Stephanie T. Nute
Elaine R. Warshell
Catherine Ravinski
Carolyn W. Baldwin
Dorothy Bickford-Desmond
Charlotte Crane
Pamela D. Kelly
Janine Gawryl
Cathy J. Green
Jody D. Handy
Dona L. Heller
Carolyn H. Henneman
Constance G. Jackson
Barbara R. Keshen
Karin Kramer
Jane R. Lawrence
Ellen L. Arnold
Lizbeth Lyons
Elizabeth Marean Mueller
Marilyn Billings McNamara
Margaret B. Morin
Nancy V. Sisemoore
Susan Vercillo Duprey
Lanea A. Witkus
Nancy O. Dodge

See also  
 List of first women lawyers and judges in the United States
 Timeline of women lawyers in the United States
 Women in law

Other topics of interest 

 List of first minority male lawyers and judges in the United States
 List of first minority male lawyers and judges in New Hampshire

References 

Lawyers, New Hampshire, first
New Hampshire, first
Women, New Hampshire, first
Women, New Hampshire, first
Women in New Hampshire
Lists of people from New Hampshire
New Hampshire lawyers